The following lists events that happened during 1975 in Laos.

Incumbents
Monarch: Savang Vatthana (abdicated 2 December)
President: Souphanouvong (starting 2 December)
Prime Minister: Souvanna Phouma (until 2 December), Kaysone Phomvihane (starting 2 December)

Events
2 December - Sisavang Vatthana resigns, ending the Kingdom of Laos

References

 
Years of the 20th century in Laos
Laos
1970s in Laos
Laos